Hunting is the practice of pursuing animals to capture or kill them.

Hunting may also refer to:
 Predation, animals hunting animals

Geography 
 Hunting, Moselle, a village in the French department of Moselle
 Hunting, Wisconsin, United States, a former unincorporated community

Film and television 
 Hunting (film), 1991 Australian film
 "Hunting" (House), a 2005 episode of the television series House
 Good Will Hunting, a 1997 film
 The Hunting, a 2019 Australian TV series

Companies 
 Hunting Aircraft, a former British aircraft manufacturer (1933–1959); consumed into what, at 2010, is BAE Systems
 Hunting-Clan Air Transport, a former private British airline (1946–1960); consumed into what, at 2010, is British United Airways
 Hunting Engineering, a former engineering company, which later became INSYS (2001) and, as of 2005, is now part of Lockheed Martin Corporation
 Hunting plc, a British oil and gas company

Other 
 Hunting (surname)
 Hunting (Carracci), a canvas by Italian painter Annibale Carracci, dated before 1595
 Hunting oscillation, a self-exciting oscillation, also known as shimmy, a side-to-side instability seen in railway trains
 Fox hunting, an equestrian activity
 Line hunting, a methodology of distributing phone calls from a single telephone number to a group of several phone lines
 Hunting dog, any dog who assists humans in hunting
 Hunting success, accuracy of predation

See also 
 Hunt (disambiguation)
 Hunted (disambiguation)
 Hunter (disambiguation)
 Huntress (disambiguation)